The first Japanese magazine was published in Japan in October 1867. The magazine named Seiyo-Zasshi (meaning Western Magazine in English) was established and published until September 1869 by Shunzo Yanagawa, a Japanese scholar. In 1940 there were nearly 3,000 magazines in the country. Following World War II the number of magazines significantly increased. At the end of 2011 there were 3,376 magazines in the country.

The following is a list of magazines published in Japan. These may or may not be published in Japanese.

A

Aera (1988–)
 Akai tori (1918–1936)
 An an (1970–)
AneCan (2007–2016)
Animage (1978–)
Animedia (magazine)

B

Bead Friend (2003–)
Beautiful Lady & Television (1997–)
Best Motoring (1987–2011)
Big Comic (1968–)
Big Comic Original (1972–)
Bis (2001–)
Bluestocking (1911–1916)
 Bōken sekai (1908–1920)
Brutus (1980–)
Bungeishunjū (1923–)
Burrn! (1984–)

C

CanCam (1981–)
CARTOP 
Cawaii! (1996–2009)
Chagurin
 ChokiChoki
Chūōkōron (1887–)
Ciao (1977–)
Classy (1984–)
Comic Kairakuten
Comptiq (1983–)
CoroCoro Comic (1977–)
Cosmode (2002–)
Croissant
CQ ham radio (1946–)
Cure (2003–)

D

Daruma Magazine (1994–2011)
Dengeki Hobby Magazine (1998–2015)
Dengeki Maoh (2005–)
Dengeki PlayStation (1994–2020)
Drift Tengoku (1996–)

E–G

Egg (1995–2014)
Facta (2005–)
Faust (2003–2011)
Five Nine
 Front (1942–1945)
Fruits (1997–2017)
 Fujin Gahō (1905–)
 Fujin no Tomo (1908–)
 Fujin Sekai (1906–1933)
 Fujin shinpo
 Fujin Seikatsu
Gekkan bunkazai (1963–)
Gothic & Lolita Bible (2001–)

H–I

Hanako (1988–)
Happie Nuts (2004–2016)
Hiragana Times
Hobby of Model Railroading (1947–)
Huge
I Love Mama (2008–)
 Ie no Hikari (1925–)

J

Japan Railfan Magazine (1961–)
Japan Spotlight (1982–)
Japanzine (1990–)
Jiji shinpō
JJ (1975–)
 Jogaku Sekai (1901–1925)
 Jogaku zasshi
 Josei (1922–1928)
 Josei Jishin (1958–)
The Journal of Insectivorous Plant Society (1950–)
Jump Square (2007–)
Junon (1973–)

K

Kansai Time Out (1977–2009)
 Kabuki shinpō (1879–1897)
 Kingu (1924–1957)
Koakuma Ageha (2005–)
Kodomo no kuni (children's magazine) (1922–1944)
Kokoku Hihyo (1979–2009)
 Kokumin no Tomo (1887–1897)

L–O

Love Berry (2001–2012)
Marco Polo (1992–1995)
Meiroku zasshi (1884–1885)
MensEGG (1999–2013)
Men's Non-no
Monthly Shōnen Magazine (1964–)
Mu (1979–)
Newtype (1985–)
Nicola (1997–)
 Nippon Fujin (1942–1945)
Non-no (1971–)
Oily Boy
Option (1981–)

P

Pichi Lemon (1986–)
Pinky (2004–2010)
Popeye (1976–)
PopSister (2010–2011)
Popteen (1980–)

R–S

Ranzuki (2000–)
Seventeen (1967–)
Shashin Shūhō (1938–1945)
 Shirakaba (1910–1923)
Shiso (1921–)
Shojo no Tomo (1908–1955)
Shufu no Tomo (1917–2008)
 Shūkan Bunshun
Shūkan Famitsū (1985–)
 Shukan Shincho  (1956–)
 Soen (1936–)
 Sweet (1999–)

T–V

 Taiyō (1895–1928)
 Tianyi bao (1907–1908)
 Tōbaé (1887–1889)
Tsubomi (2009–2012)
Uchusen (1980–2005, 2008–)
V Jump (1993–)
Vivi (1983–)

W

Weekly Manga Goraku (1968–)
Weekly Manga Sunday (1959–2013)
Weekly Morning (1982–)
Weekly Shōnen Champion (1969–)
Weekly Shōnen Jump (1968–)
Weekly Shōnen Magazine (1959–)
Weekly Shōnen Sunday (1959–)
Weekly Toyo Keizai (1895–)
Weekly Young Jump (1979–)
Weekly Young Magazine (1980–)

Y

 You
 Young Animal Arashi
 Young Magazine Uppers
 Young You
 Yūben (1910–1941)
 Yuraku
 Yuri Shimai

See also
List of Japanese manga magazines by circulation
List of manga magazines#Published in Japan
List of magazines by circulation#Japan

References

 
Japan
Magazines